The second season of the Canadian television comedy series Video on Trial premiered on MuchMusic on August 27, 2006 and concluded on July 15, 2007. It consists of 30 episodes.

Background
Video on Trial features music videos being humorously critiqued in a manner akin to a courtroom trial. The show's tongue-in-cheek manifesto, as announced in its original opening sequence, is seeing to it that "all music videos are brought to justice". A typical half-hour episode features five music videos being "tried" by a panel of five personalities acting as jurors.

Production
Episodes in season two of Video on Trial adhere to the show's original format. Each episode commences with a roll call of the jury and a reading of the docket of accused music videos, with the remainder of the episode being dedicated to the trials for each video. The specific charges leveled at a video are announced at the beginning of its trial, and a final verdict for the artist of the video is later presented. Final verdicts were originally presented at the end of an episode; towards the end of the season, this was changed, with each video's verdict now being presented at the conclusion of its trial.

A 90-minute-long special loosely based on Video on Trial entitled LOL! aired on MuchMusic on May 15, 2007, concurrently with this season, and featured Aaron Merke, Trevor Boris, Dini Dimakos, Sabrina Jalees, Darrin Rose, and Pat Thorton—all but one of whom had previously appeared on Video on Trial—discussing current gossip.

A "Hair Bands Edition" special episode, in which music videos by hair metal bands were to be tried by jurors wearing typical "hair band" outfits and wigs, was planned for season two but ultimately never aired. It would have been episode 17 of the season; according to one Video on Trial producer, it was scrapped because it was "not completed by five judges in a timely manner". Jurors included Ron Sparks, Debra DiGiovanni, and Katherine Ryan, and the videos to be tried were "Smokin' in the Boys Room" by Mötley Crüe, "Cherry Pie" by Warrant, "Here I Go Again" by Whitesnake, "Talk Dirty to Me" by Poison, and "In and Out of Love" by Bon Jovi. Clips from the unfinished episode were later aired as part of the "Video on Trial: 100!" season four special.

Reception
The thirteenth episode of the season ("Video on Trial: '80s Superstars") was nominated for Best Music, Variety Program or Series at the 22nd Gemini Awards.

Episodes

References

2006 Canadian television seasons
2007 Canadian television seasons